Niclas Levein (born March 3, 1988 in Linköping, Sweden) is a former Swedish ice hockey player.

He made his debut with Färjestads BK in the Elitserien during the 2006/07 season, playing a total of 5 games. After the season, he left Färjestads and signed a try-out contract with Rögle BK. In December 2007 Levein decided to retire from professional hockey due to an injury. He also played with Enköpings SK.

External links
Stat's at EliteProspects.com

1988 births
Living people
Swedish ice hockey forwards
Färjestad BK players
Sportspeople from Linköping
Sportspeople from Östergötland County